Lychnorhizidae is a family of true jellyfish.

Species 
The following species are recognized in the family Lychnorhizidae:

 Anomalorhiza
Anomalorhiza shawi Light, 1921
 Lychnorhiza
Lychnorhiza arubae Stiasny, 1920
Lychnorhiza lucerna Haeckel, 1880
Lychnorhiza malayensis Stiasny, 1920
 Pseudorhiza
Pseudorhiza aurosa von Lendenfeld, 1882
Pseudorhiza haeckeli Haacke, 1884
Within the Lychnorhizidae family there is the Anomalorhiza shawi species which is located in Kota Kinabalu.

References

 
Daktyliophorae
Cnidarian families